Pourquoi-Pas or Pourquoi Pas? (from French pourquoi pas? 'why not?') may refer to one of these ships:

 Four ships owned by the French navigator and naval officer Jean-Baptiste Charcot:
 , a  cutter that Charcot had built in 1893 and in which he made a 2-week voyage in 1894.  He sold her in 1896 to buy Pourquoi Pas ? II
 , the new name given by Charcot to a  wooden schooner he bought in 1896, sold in 1897, and bought back in 1897; from 1897 he sailed her in British waters and in 1902 sailed towards Iceland, entering the Arctic Circle for the first time and approaching the glaciers
 , the new name given by Charcot to a  iron schooner with a steam-engine he acquired in 1897 and in which he sailed down the River Nile as far as Aswan with the millionaire Vanderbilt
 , the most famous of the four
 , a research vessel of the IFREMER and the French Navy, named in honour of the previous ships

French Navy ship names